Creosote is a category of carbonaceous chemicals formed by the distillation of tars and by the pyrolysis of plant-derived material.

Creosote may also refer to:

 Creosote bush, a flowering plant in the family Zygophyllaceae
 Creosote, Bainbridge Island, Washington, a locality in Washington State, U.S.A.
 Creosote, a character in Terry Pratchett's books whose name puns on Croesus
 Mr Creosote, a fictional character in Monty Python's The Meaning of Life, played by Terry Jones
 "Creosote", a song by Son Volt from the 1997 album Straightaways
 "Creosote", a song by The Desert Sessions from the 2003 album Volumes 9 & 10

See also
 Croesus